Polyctenium is a genus of flowering plants in the family Brassicaceae, native to the Great Basin region of the Western United States.

The plants are known by the common name combleaf, owing to the resemblance of their deeply lobed leaves to a comb.

Species
There are two species within the genus: 
Polyctenium williamsiae — Washoe combleaf; quite rare and is specially protected in Nevada. Found in the Washoe Valley playas of the Virginia Range.
Polyctenium fremontii — Desert combleaf; more common species, found in the Great Basin habitats of northeastern California, southeast Oregon, southwest Idaho, and northwest Nevada.

References

External links
USDA Plants Profile for Polyctenium (combleaf)

Brassicaceae
Brassicaceae genera
Flora of the Great Basin